Royal Air Force Towyn or more simply RAF Towyn is a former Royal Air Force airfield located  west of Machynlleth, Powys and  north of Aberystwyth, Ceredigion, Wales.

It was operational from 1940 and closed in 1945.

History

The camp was opened on 8 September 1940 as an Anti-Aircraft Co-operation unit for nearby Tonfanau under No.70 Group Army Co-operation Command (AACU). The main function of the Flights on the base was to tow targets for the AACU at Tonfanau.

In December 1943, No 1603 and 1628 Flights were disbanded and joined together to form No. 631 Squadron (RAF). This Squadron stayed at Towyn until May 1945 when it moved on to RAF Llanbedr and the base was closed to flying soon afterwards.

The base continued to be a military working environment being used periodically over the years.

The following units were here at some point:
 'C' Flight of No. 1 Anti-Aircraft Co-operation Unit RAF (1 AACU).
 'U' Flight of 1 AACU .
 No. 6 Anti-Aircraft Co-operation Unit RAF.
 No. 8 Anti-Aircraft Co-operation Unit RAF.
 No. 1605 (Anti-Aircraft Co-operation) Flight RAF
 No. 1628 (Anti-Aircraft Co-operation) Flight RAF
 No. 631 Squadron RAF
 Aberystwyth UAS

References

Citations

Bibliography

External links

Royal Air Force stations in Wales
Royal Air Force stations of World War II in the United Kingdom